Milo Gibson (born November 16, 1990) is an Australian actor. He is the son of Mel Gibson. He is known for his roles in All the Devil's Men, Breaking & Exiting, Gangster Land, and Hacksaw Ridge.

Biography
Gibson was born in Australia and raised in Malibu. Gibson worked as an electrician prior to starting his acting career. Gibson made his film debut in his father's film Hacksaw Ridge.

He had a major role as Lt. Johnny Kent in the 2018 film Hurricane, which was also released under the titles Hurricane: 303 Squadron, 303: Bitwa o Anglię in Poland and Mission of Honor in the United States.

Filmography

References

External links

1990 births
21st-century American male actors
American male film actors
American people of Australian descent
American people of Irish descent
Australian male film actors
Living people
Male actors from Malibu, California
Milo